Telkom 4, also known as Merah Putih, is an Indonesian geostationary communication satellite built by Space Systems/Loral that is located at an orbital position of 108° East and is operated by PT Telekomunikasi Indonesia Tbk. The satellite is based on the SSL 1300 satellite bus and has a life expectancy of 16 years. It was launched on 7 August 2018, at 05:18 UTC or 12:18 Jakarta Time, using the SpaceX Falcon 9 Block 5 launcher from Cape Canaveral Air Force Station, Florida, United States.

Satellite description 
This satellite carries 60 active transponders consisting of 24 C-Band transponders and 12 Extended C-Band transponders which will serve the Southeast Asia region, including Indonesia, as well as 24 C-Band transponders which will reach the South Asia region. The satellite relies on the SSL 1300 satellite bus with a design life of 16 years with up to 21 years of fuel remaining. The development of the Merah Putih Satellite involves two U.S. companies, namely SSL as a satellite manufacturer and SpaceX as a launch service provider. Telkom-4 is devoted to serving high-definition television (HDTV) broadcasts, GSM and Internet services.

Launch 
Telkom-4 was launched using the SpaceX Falcon 9 Block 5 first stage B1046.2 from Cape Canaveral Air Force Station (CCAFS), Florida, United States on 7 August 2018, at 01:18 UTC. The launch was the first time SpaceX reused one of the Block 5 variant of the Falcon 9 rocket boosters. After successfully separating from the second stage, the first stage landed on the SpaceX drone ship Of Course I Still Love You.

Project cost 
The launch of the Telkom-4 (Merah Putih) satellite saves around 25% of the cost of launching the previous satellite, the Telkom-3S satellite, which was launched on 15 February 2017, which cost US$215 million. Meanwhile, the Merah Putih satellite only costs US$165 million and includes insurance costs of US$10 million.

Service users 
Due to the inadequacy of the Palapa-D satellite to operate until July 2020, while the replacement satellite, Nusantara Dua (Palapa N1), failed to reach orbit, many TV and radio channels migrated from Palapa-D to Telkom-4. Below is a list of frequency of channels that have migrated as of July 2020:

References

External links 
 Telkom Group – Official Website PT.Telekomunikasi Indonesia.tbk
 Telkomsat – Satellite Operator's Official Website
 Lyngsat Telkom-4 at 108.0°E – channel frequency list

Satellites of Indonesia
Telkom Indonesia
Television in Indonesia